St Michael and All Angels Church is a Church of England parish church in the Gidea Park area of Romford, east London. The area had become a garden suburb in the 1910s and a church dedicated to St Michael was built there in 1928, as a mission church of the parish church of All Saints Squirrels Heath (now Ardleigh Green). Gidea Park was formed as an ecclesiastical district of its own in 1931 and a parish church commissioned from the architects Crowe and Careless. It was completed and consecrated on 21 May 1938, with the ecclesiastical district upgraded to a parish and the mission church building converted into the Bishop Chadwick Hall.

References

Gidea Park
20th-century Church of England church buildings
Churches completed in 1938